Óscar Rodríguez-Sánchez (born 7 October 1984) is a Colombian former professional tennis player.

Born in Bogotá, Rodríguez's career included an appearance in a home Davis Cup tie against Brazil in 2005, losing to André Sá in the reverse singles. His biggest title win on the professional tour was in doubles at a Bogotá Challenger tournament in 2004. He reached career best rankings of 727 in singles and 554 in doubles.

Challenger/Futures titles

Doubles

References

External links
 
 
 

1984 births
Living people
Colombian male tennis players
Sportspeople from Bogotá
20th-century Colombian people
21st-century Colombian people